The Town of Howard is located in southwestern Chippewa County in the U.S. state of Wisconsin. The population was 798 at the 2010 census, up from 648 at the 2000 census. The unincorporated communities of Albertville and Howard are located in the town.

History
The town was named for Brigadier General Benjamin Howard, an officer in the War of 1812.

Geography
The town is bordered to the west by Dunn County, on the north by the Town of Cooks Valley, on the east by the Town of Tilden, and on the south by the Town of Wheaton.

Demographics

As of the census of 2000, there were 648 people, 235 households, and 187 families residing in the town. The population density was 18.1 people per square mile (7.0/km2). There were 237 housing units at an average density of 6.6 per square mile (2.6/km2). The racial makeup of the town was 99.07% White, 0.62% Asian, 0.15% from other races, and 0.15% from two or more races. Hispanic or Latino of any race were 0.15% of the population.

There were 235 households, out of which 35.7% had children under the age of 18 living with them, 66.4% were married couples living together, 7.2% had a female householder with no husband present, and 20.4% were non-families. 15.3% of all households were made up of individuals, and 6.4% had someone living alone who was 65 years of age or older. The average household size was 2.76 and the average family size was 3.10.

The population was 27.2% under the age of 18, 9.0% from 18 to 24, 31.2% from 25 to 44, 22.7% from 45 to 64, and 10.0% who were 65 years of age or older. The median age was 36 years. For every 100 females, there were 111 males. For every 100 females age 18 and over, there were 109 males.

The median income for a household in the town was $42,109, and the median income for a family was $44,125. Males had a median income of $30,682 versus $21,667 for females. The per capita income for the town was $15,274. About 3.6% of families and 8.2% of the population were below the poverty line, including 13.4% of those under age 18 and 13.6% of those age 65 or over.

References

External links
 Town of Howard, Wisconsin website

Towns in Chippewa County, Wisconsin
Eau Claire–Chippewa Falls metropolitan area
Towns in Wisconsin